The Honda CLR CityFly was introduced in 1998 as a dual purpose motorcycle and is powered by a  SOHC single-cylinder engine. The machine does not have the same engine as the Honda CG but the engine from the Honda XLR offroad motorcycle. The CLR "CityFly" was discontinued in 2003. Although the motorcycle was launched as a dual purpose machine, it was better known for city use and town use; this was mainly due to the lack of power of the engine.
 
The Honda CLR received mostly favorable reviews upon release.

References

CLR
Motorcycles introduced in 1998
Dual-sport motorcycles